Standings and results for Group 1 of the UEFA Euro 2000 qualifying tournament.

Standings

Matches

Goalscorers

Notes

References

Group 1
1998–99 in Italian football
Qual
1998–99 in Welsh football
1999–2000 in Welsh football
1998–99 in Danish football
Qual
1998–99 in Swiss football
1999–2000 in Swiss football
1998 in Belarusian football
1999 in Belarusian football